Klokovo is a rural locality (a village) in Chuchkovskoye Rural Settlement, Sokolsky District, Vologda Oblast, Russia. The population was 10 as of 2002.

Geography 
Klokovo is located 82 km northeast of Sokol (the district's administrative centre) by road. Bilino is the nearest rural locality.

References 

Rural localities in Sokolsky District, Vologda Oblast